"Innervision" is a song by Armenian-American heavy metal band System of a Down, released as a promotional single from their third studio album, Steal This Album!

Overview 
Innervision was released as the first of two singles from Steal This Album!, but unlike Boom!, it did not receive a music video.

The song was leaked prior to the album's release, although it was not included in the Toxicity II bootleg, rather than being leaked in a separate way. The origin of the leak is unknown. The leaked version features a slightly different arrangement and lyrics, most predominantly in the bridge and second verse where layered vocals are used on the album version.

Track listing

Chart positions

Personnel 
All credits adapted from the CD single.

System of a Down
 Serj Tankian – vocals
 Daron Malakian – guitars, vocals
 Shavo Odadjian – bass
 John Dolmayan – drums

Production
 Produced by Rick Rubin and Daron Malakian
 Co-Produced by Serj Tankian
 Recorded by David Schiffman
 Mixed by Andy Wallace
 Mastered by Vlado Meller
 CD sleeve by Brandy Flower

References

External links 
"Innervision" lyrics on Systemofadown.com

2002 songs
2002 singles
System of a Down songs
Song recordings produced by Rick Rubin
Songs written by Daron Malakian
Songs written by Serj Tankian